Guido Andreozzi and Guillermo Durán are the defending champions, but only Guido Andreozzi is playing in this year's edition.

Seeds

Draw

References
 Main Draw

Aberto de Tenis do Rio Grande do Sul - Doubles
2015 Doubles